Japan Actuel's FC is a football club from Madagascar based in Analamanga.

Achievements
THB Champions League: 1
2011

Performance in CAF competitions
CAF Champions League: 1 appearance
2012 -

Players

Football clubs in Madagascar
Analamanga